Buddy may refer to:

People
Buddy (nickname)
Buddy (rapper), real name Simmie Sims III (1993–Present)
Buddy Rogers (wrestler), ring name of American professional wrestler Herman Gustav Rohde, Jr. (1921–1992)
Buddy Boeheim (born 1999), American basketball player
Buddy Cage (1946–2020), American pedal steel guitarist, member of the New Riders of the Purple Sage
Buddy Clark (1911–1949), American singer born Samuel Goldberg
Buddy Ebsen (1908–2003), American actor and dancer born Christian Ludolf Ebsen Jr.
Buddy Greco (1926–2017), American jazz and pop singer and pianist
Buddy Hackett (1924–2003), American actor and comedian born Leonard Hacker
Buddy Holly (1936–1959), stage name of Charles Hardin Holley, American musician, singer and songwriter
Buddy Jewell (born 1961), American country musician
Buddy Johnson (1915–1977), American pianist
Buddy Johnson (American football) (born 1999), American football player
Buddy Knox (1933–1999), American singer and songwriter
Buddy Landel, ring name of American professional wrestler William Fritz Ensor (1961–2015)
Buddy Murphy, professional wrestler for WWE
Buddy Rich (1917–1987), American jazz drummer and bandleader born Bernard Rich
Buddy Valastro (born 1977), American baker and reality television personality

Fictional characters
 Buddy, a member of the Short Circus on the American television series The Electric Company
 Buddy, a fictional T. Rex and protagonist of Dinosaur Train
 Buddy Bradley, the protagonist of Peter Bagge's comic book Hate!
 Buddy Baker, aka Animal Man, from DC Comics
 Buddy Cole, recurring character on the Canadian sketch-comedy show The Kids In The Hall portrayed by Scott Thompson
 Buddy Hobbes, protagonist of the film Elf, played by Will Ferrell
 Buddy Lee, a doll that served as an advertising mascot for Lee Jeans in the mid-20th century and the turn of the 21st century
 Buddy Lembeck, a character on the 1980s TV sitcom Charles in Charge
 Letitia "Buddy" Lawrence, the younger daughter on the 1970s TV drama Family
 Buddy Love, the alter ego of the Nutty Professor in the 1963 and 1996 films of that name
 Buddy Pine, the alter ego of Syndrome, the supervillain from the 2004 film The Incredibles
 Buddy Threadgoode, a character in Fried Green Tomatoes
 Buddy, a character from Looney Tunes
 Buddy, a blue mute rat in The Nut Job and its sequel The Nut Job 2: Nutty by Nature
Buddy, a character in the video game Lisa: The Painful
 Buddy, one of the four protagonists in SuperKitties

Transportation
 Buddy (electric car), a Norwegian electric car
 Buddy (scooter), a motor scooter

Books
 Buddy (Hinton novel), a 1982 novel by Nigel Hinton
 Buddy (Herlong novel), a 2012 novel by M.H. Herlong

Film and TV
 Buddy film, a genre in which two (or on occasion, more than two) people, often both men, are put together
 Buddy (1997 film), a film about a gorilla named Buddy
 Buddy (2003 film), a Norwegian film
 Buddy (2013 film), an Indian film
 Buddy (TV series), a 1986 BBC schools drama

Music
 Buddy – The Buddy Holly Story, a jukebox musical on the career of Buddy Holly
 Buddy, artistic name for Italian singer Gianni Nazzaro
 Buddy (German singer), artistic name for German singer Sebastian Erl  
 Buddy (band), a California indie pop band
 "Buddy" (De La Soul song), a 1989 song by De La Soul
 "Buddy" (Musiq Soulchild song), a 2007 song by Musiq Soulchild
 "Buddy", a 1969 song on the Good Times album by Willie Nelson
"Buddy", a 2007 song on the Action album by B'z
 "Buddy", fandom name for K-pop girl group GFriend

Other uses
 Buddy (dog), pet of former U.S. President Bill Clinton
 Buddy (magazine), a music magazine serving the Texas area
 Buddy (software), a Docker-based continuous integration tool
 "The Buddies", nickname of St Mirren F.C., a football club based in Paisley

See also
 
 
 Buddy L, an American toy company
 Buddy system, a procedure in which two people operate together as a single unit so that they are able to monitor and help each other
 My Buddy (doll), a doll made by Hasbro
 Bud (disambiguation)
 Buddies (disambiguation)